Zatyshne, known as Radhospne until 2016, is a village in Kharkiv Raion, Kharkiv Oblast (province) of Ukraine.

References

Villages in Kharkiv Raion